Pararhaphidoglossa is a moderately diverse neotropical genus of potter wasps.

References

 Giordani Soika, A. 1978. Revisione degli Eumenidi neotropicali appartenenti ai generi Eumenes Latr., Omicron (Sauss.), Pararaphidoglossa  Schulth. ed affini. Boll. Mus. Civ. Stor. Nat. Venezia 29: 1–420.

Potter wasps
Hymenoptera genera